The women's 3000 metres event  at the 2011 European Athletics Indoor Championships was held on March 5–6 with the final being held on March 6 at 15:15 local time.

Records

Results

Heats
First 4 in each heat and 4 best performers advanced to the Final.

Final 
The final was held at 15:15.

References 

3000 metres at the European Athletics Indoor Championships
2011 European Athletics Indoor Championships
2011 in women's athletics